Lovelorn is a 2005 Turkish drama film, written and directed by Yavuz Turgul, starring Şener Şen as a teacher recently returned to Istanbul who must protect a nightclub singer from her violent ex-husband.

Plot
Nazım, a primary school teacher, returns to Istanbul from his posting in the east . He temporarily takes on a job as a taxi driver with the help of his friend Atakan. One night he picks up Dünya, a singer at a club and after striking up a friendship, becomes her driver. While Nazım is waiting for Dünya to finish her performance one night, she is attacked by a man. Dünya is injured, and is rushed to the hospital by Nazım.

Dünya reveals that he is her ex-husband Halil, who wants to take away their daughter Melek. Nazım takes Dünya and Melek into his home but Halil continues to stalk them. Halil reveals to Nazım that he still loves Dünya and wants to remarry her to start over a new life.  After he gives his word, Dünya and Melek leave with them.  Meanwhile, Nazım faces up to his failed obligations to his own children Mehmet and Piraye.

One day, Nazım gets a phone call from Dünya asking for protection from Halil who has gone back to his old ways. Nazım travels to meet Dünya at the otobus terminal, but Halil gets wind of this and confronts them there. Halil asks Dünya to sing a folk song to him for the last time, before he would let her go. Halil is euphoric when he hears Dunya singing passionately, but then realises that it isn't directed at him, but at Nazım. Halil becomes enraged and shoots Dünya. He then turns the gun on himself, after leaving Melek in Nazım's care.

Cast
Şener Şen as Nazım
Meltem Cumbul as Dünya
Timuçin Esen as Halil
Güven Kıraç as Mehmet
Sümer Tilmaç as Takoz
Ece Naz Kızıltan as Melek
Devin Özgür Çınar as Piraye
Erdal Tosun as Haşmet
Mübeccel Vardar as Berrin
Aynur Doğan as herself

Awards
The film won three awards at the 42nd Antalya Golden Orange Film Festival: Best Actor (Şener Şen), Best Supporting Actor (Timuçin Esen) and Best Music (Tamer Çıray). Timuçin Esen was awarded the Best Supporting Actor at the 27th SİYAD Awards. Additionally it was named Best Film at the International Queens Film Festival.

References

External links

2005 films
2000s Turkish-language films
2005 drama films
Films set in Turkey
Turkish drama films